The Chairman of East Hertfordshire District Council is the ceremonial head of the council, first citizen of district and the chair of full council meetings. At full council meetings, the chairman must ensure the smooth running of meetings, uphold the constitution, interpret the rules of procedure and maintain an 'apolitical stance.' The chairman may, though, exercise a casting vote in the case of a tied vote with 'complete freedom of conscience.' The chairman is forbidden by the constitution from being a member of the council's executive. The chairman is elected annually by council.

Since the start of the 2008 municipal year, chairmen have served only a single consecutive one year term instead of the two or three year terms of office previously common. However, Jonathan Kaye served two consecutive terms in 2019-21 due to the special circumstances caused by the Covid pandemic.

Previous chairmen of the council are commemorated on boards in the council chamber of East Herts Council at Wallfields, Pegs Lane, Hertford.

See also 
 East Hertfordshire District Council

References 

District Council